Kvalsund or Kvalsundet may refer to:

Places

Finnmark county, Norway
Kvalsund, a municipality in Finnmark county
Kvalsundet, a strait in Kvalsund Municipalit
Kvalsund (village), a village in Kvalsund Municipality
Kvalsund Church, a church in Kvalsund Municipality
Kvalsund Bridge, a bridge in Kvalsund Municipality

Møre og Romsdal county, Norway
Kvalsund (Herøy), a village in Herøy Municipality in Møre og Romsdal county, Norway

Troms county, Norway
Kvalsund Tunnel, an undersea tunnel in Tromsø Municipality
Kvalsundet (Tromsø), a strait in Tromsø Municipality

Other
Kvalsund ship, an ancient ship which was discovered near Kvalsund in Herøy Municipality in Møre og Romsdal, Norway